Hemimachairodus is an extinct genus of saber-tooth cat of the tribe Machairodontini and subfamily Machairodontinae. The type species, Hemimachairodus zwierzyckii was previously assigned to the genus Homotherium.

Fossil segments of Hemimachairodus were unearthed in Pleistocene dig sites in Java in Indonesia alongside other predators such as Panthera tigris, Homotherium ultimum, and Megacyon merriami, and it most likely competed with these species for prey.

References

Machairodontinae
Pleistocene carnivorans
Pleistocene mammals of Asia
Fossil taxa described in 1974
Prehistoric carnivoran genera